Shepherd Racing Ventures is an American professional stock car racing team that currently competes in the NASCAR Xfinity Series. The team currently fields the No. 89 Chevrolet Camaro, although a driver has yet to be announced.

Beginnings
It began in 2001 in the Craftsman Truck Series as No. 6 with Morgan Shepherd as the owner/driver and Red Line Oil sponsoring, running under the moniker Victory in Jesus Racing.

Sprint Cup Series
It moved up to Nextel Cup the next year, fielding the No. 89 Ford Taurus. It debuted at New Hampshire International Speedway and ran four more races that year, each ending in a DNF and Victory in Jesus taking over sponsorship.  After 2002, the team ran a part-time schedule for Shepherd.

Xfinity Series

In 2007, SRV, still under its original name Faith Motorsports, stopped fielding cars in the Sprint Cup Series and moved back to the Nationwide Series and ran the majority of the races in the second half of the season.

For 2008, the team attempted the full schedule for the first time. The season was highlighted by Shepherd's 13th place finish at Talladega Superspeedway. Other good runs were scattered throughout the year.

In 2009, the team switched to Chevrolet. After a slew of DNQs, the team was forced to start and park several races. It was an up and down year for the team.

In 2010, Faith Motorsports started the year with high hopes and came back to finish 22nd in the season opener in Daytona after an early race issue with the car. A special "Fans For Faith" donation fund was formed, and any fan could donate $100.00 to have their name put on the car. About mid-season, Faith Motorsports allied with Richard Childress Racing (RCR). Shepherd split his time between the 89 car and RCR's 21. Johnny Chapman and Brett Rowe took the reins of the 89, and mostly start and parked while Shepherd was in the 21. The alliance with RCR allowed Shepherd to use the 21 car's owner points to guarantee that the 89 would make the first five races of 2011.

For 2011, the team returned full-time with the 89 driven by Shepherd. A second car was formed, the 55 driven by Brett Rowe. This car is mainly used to start and park, which helps fund the primary 89. After DNQs in Daytona and Texas, the 55 decided to skip Talladega. In 2013 the team ran Dodges at the restrictor plate tracks (Daytona and Talladega). The team also ran as many races as possible, using Chevrolet. In 2014, Shepherd qualified for the Nationwide race at Dover, but failed to qualify for the races at Kentucky Speedway and New Hampshire Motor Speedway.

2015 saw Shepherd enter Daytona, but withdrew midweek. Shepherd qualified for Atlanta and Las Vegas, but DNQ'd for Phoenix. Shepherd later qualified for Bristol, finishing 38th. Shepherd's team attempted 20 races but didn't run any races to completion. In 2016, SRV partnered with CM2, a company that helps teams find funding so that Shepherd can run races to the finish. Shepherd celebrated his 50th year of racing in 2017.  In 2018, Landon Cassill ran the season-ending race at Homestead-Miami Speedway.

Cassill ran ten races for Shepherd Racing Ventures in 2019, though he failed to finish all but one. At the Rhino Pro Truck Outfitters 300 in Las Vegas, Cassill qualified ninth for the team's first top-ten starting position since Shepherd qualified tenth at Daytona in 2009. In Homestead, the team acquired sufficient sponsorship to run the full Ford EcoBoost 300. After qualifying 13th, Cassill finished 15th for the team's first completed race since Dover in 2013 and their first top-15 run since Las Vegas in 2009. SVR planned on attempting the majority of the 2020 NASCAR Xfinity Series schedule with Landon Cassill behind the wheel. Following NASCAR's return in May 2020, the 89 returned for only one race, the series return at Darlington. Team owner Morgan Shepherd said that despite the field expansion from 36 cars to 40, lack of qualifying wasn't going to allow the team to show off for potential sponsors, and the purse for positions 37-40 was only $5,000, much less than the team's expenses. 

Shepherd hoped to run the team in 2021, despite his Parkinson's diagnosis. Cassill would depart for JD Motorsports, and the lack of a superspeedway car prevented the 89 from attempting Daytona. Shepherd later said that the 89 wouldn't return until the team had sufficient sponsorship and qualifying would return on a regular basis.

Motorsports career results

NASCAR
(key) (Bold – Pole position awarded by qualifying time. Italics – Pole position earned by points standings or practice time. * – Most laps led.)

Nextel Cup Series

Xfinity Series (primary entry)

Xfinity Series (secondary entry)

 Includes points scored by Richard Childress Racing

Craftsman Truck Series

Footnotes

References

External links
 Shepherd Racing Ventures Ministry
 

NASCAR teams